Lukousaurus is an archosauromorph based on most of a small skull's snout, displaying distinctive lachrymal horns, found in the Early Jurassic-age Lower Lufeng Formation, Yunnan, China and was described by Chung Chien Young in 1940. The generic name refers to the Lugou Bridge, lit. “crossroads”, near Beijing, where the Sino-Japanese War started. L. yini is tentatively classified as a theropod dinosaur by some allied to ceratosaurs, by others a coelurosaur. Its skull is rather robust for its size though the teeth were described by the author as typically theropodan. Whatever Lukousaurus was, it was definitely an archosauromorph.

History 
At a locality in the town of Huangchiatien (also called Dahungtien) in Yunnan Province, China, a partial anterior skull and lower jaws as well as possibly a tooth and humerus found nearby. The skull was found in the lower Jurassic strata of the Red Beds of the Lufeng Formation, though at the time of its naming in 1940 by Chung Chien Young the beds were thought to date to the Triassic. Young noted that the skull is very strange, with morphologies similar to those of not just Coelurosaurs, which he thought the taxon was, but also Prosauropods and Carnosaurs. The generic name refers to the Lugou Bridge, lit. “crossroads”, near Beijing, where the Sino-Japanese War started and a symbol of the Chinese resistance against Japanese imperialism. The species name honors the former deputy Director of the Geological Survey of China, T. H. Yin, who kept work on the survey continuing despite the Japanese invasion. The holotype specimen is housed within the Institute of Vertebrate Paleontology and Paleoanthropology in Beijing, China under specimen number IVPP 23. Simmons, 1965 assigned a distal humerus and co-ossified tibia and fibula to Lukousaurus, though there is no overlap between elements.

Classification 
The classification of Lukousaurus is very uncertain due to the strange characteristics of the type specimen and its referred humerus. Lukousaurus was first described as a Coelurosaur based on its postorbital and the shaped of the orbit compared to Saltopus, Podokesaurus, and Ammosaurus, though none of these taxa are now considered Coelurosaurs. The size and "some characteristics of the skull" were also noted as being similar to Palaeosaurus, though Palaeosaurus is considered dubious. Dong Zhiming in his book on Chinese dinosaurs assigned Lukousaurus to Podokesauridae in 1992, a similar conclusion to Young's original classification with Podokesaurus, though in 1997 Kenneth Carpenter placed it as an indeterminate Theropod. In 2008, Mickey Mortimer believed that Lukousaurus was either an abelisaurid ceratosaur or a sphenosuchian, but revised her position in 2011 after placing it as a basal pseudosuchian using a phylogenetic matrix developed by Sterling Nesbitt. Knoll et al., 2012 found Lukousuchus to be similar to suchian archosaurs in the anatomy of the antorbital fenestra and Irmis, 2004 stated that Lukousuchus wasn't a theropod dinosaur or a dinosauromorph in general.

References

Prehistoric theropods
Early Jurassic dinosaurs of Asia
Taxa named by Yang Zhongjian
Fossil taxa described in 1940
Controversial dinosaur taxa